Edmund Reitter (22 October 1845 – 15 March 1920) was an Austrian entomologist, writer and a collector.

Biography
Edmund Reitter was best known as an expert on the beetles of the Palaearctic. He was an imperial advisor and editor of the Wiener Entomologischen Zeitung, (Vienna Entomological Gazette). In addition he was a member and honorary member of Deutsche Gesellschaft für allgemeine und angewandte Entomologie in Berlin, the Vereins für schlesische Insektenkunde in Breslau, the Museum Francisco-Carolinum in Linz, the Vereins für Naturkunde (Association for Natural History) in Austria, the Société entomologique de Russie in Saint Petersburg, the Société royale entomologique d’Égypte and the Nederlandse Entomologische Vereniging in Rotterdam.

He was also known as an insect dealer.

As a corresponding member he worked with the Naturwissenschaftlichen Verein in Troppau, the Socíetas pro Fauna et Flora fennica in Helsinki und the Real Sociedad Española de Historia Natural in Madrid.

His beetle collection is preserved in the Natural History Museum in Budapest. It contains more than 30,000 species including 5,000 type specimens.

Works 
 Die Käfer des Deutschen Reiches 5 Bände, Stuttgart K. G. Lutz 1908 - 1917 (digital: Edmund Reitter: Fauna Germanica - Die Käfer des Deutschen Reiches, Digitale Bibliothek Band 134, Directmnedia Publishing GmbH, Berlin 2006. )

See also 
 :Category:Taxa named by Edmund Reitter

Gallery

Sources 
 Guido Nonveiller (2001). Pioneers of the Research on the Insects of Dalmatia. Croatian Natural History Museum (Zagreb) : 390 pp.

References

External links 

 Fauna Germanica - Die Käfer des Deutschen Reiches at Biolib.de
--- Band 1  - Band 2  - Band 3  - Band 4  - Band 5
 Coleoptera collection in Budapest

1845 births
1920 deaths
Coleopterists
Austrian entomologists
Moravian-German people
People from Mohelnice
Austrian people of Moravian-German descent